Figliomeni is an Italian surname. Notable people with the surname include:

 Domenic Figliomeni, Canadian boxer
 Giuseppe Figliomeni, Italian footballer
Joseph Figliomeni, Canadian lawyer 
Angelo Figliomeni, Canadian mob
Rocco Figliomeni, Italian restaurant owner

Italian-language surnames